Archie Bell (born 12 April 1965) is a Scottish former professional footballer who played as a defender.

Career
Born in Kilmarnock, Bell played for Bellfield, Forfar Athletic, Kilmarnock, Hurlford United, Annbank United, Queen of the South and Kilbirnie Ladeside.

References

1965 births
Living people
Scottish footballers
Forfar Athletic F.C. players
Kilmarnock F.C. players
Hurlford United F.C. players
Annbank United F.C. players
Queen of the South F.C. players
Kilbirnie Ladeside F.C. players
Scottish Football League players
Association football defenders